...And Don't Forget to Breathe is the debut album by the post-hardcore band A Static Lullaby. On the original release, the title was misspelled as '...And Don't Forget to Breath'. This was corrected in a re-release.

Music videos were made for the songs "Lipgloss and Letdown" and "The Shooting Star That Destroyed Us."

Background
"Love to Hate, Hate to Me" (under the title "Love to Hate, Hate to Love"), "The Shooting Star That Destroyed Us", "A Sip of Wine Chased With Cyanide" and "Charred Fields of Snow" were first released on the band's self-titled debut EP.

The songs "Withered", "Lipgloss and Letdown" and "Song for a Broken Heart" originally appeared on the band's 2002 demo Withered and were re-recorded for this album.

Reception
Allmusic reviewer Kurt Morris gave the album a mixed to favorable review, comparing the band to the likes of Thursday. He complemented the vocal work and the melodies. Morris singled out "A Sip of Wine Chased with Cyanide" calling it the best track on the album, mainly for its guitar work. Morris concluded his review by saying the album will grow on the listener with each additional listen.

A Punknews.org staff reviewer also gave the album a mixed to favorable review. He compared the band to Glassjaw and Drive-Thru Records artists. He stated the music was "good, just derivative as hell". The reviewer said the song "A Sip of Wine Chased with Cyanide" came across as a rip-off of At the Drive-In's "One Armed Scissor".

Track listing
All lyrics written by Dan Arnold, all music composed by A Static Lullaby

Personnel
Personnel per booklet.

 Band
 Joe Brown – vocals
 Dan Arnold – vocals, rhythm guitar, piano, programming
 Nate Lindeman – lead guitar
 Phil Pirrone – bass, backing vocals
 Brett Dinovo – drums, percussion

 Production
 Steve Evetts – production
 Jesse Cannon – edition, engineer assistant
 Peter Lewit – legal
 Rodney Afshari – management
 Jessica Lastowski – photography

References

A Static Lullaby albums
Ferret Music albums
2003 debut albums
Albums produced by Steve Evetts